Area codes 803 and 839 are telephone area codes in the North American Numbering Plan (NANP) for the central part of the U.S. State of South Carolina. The numbering plan area (NPA) is anchored by the city of Columbia, the state capital. It also includes most of the South Carolina portions of the Charlotte, North Carolina and Augusta, Georgia metropolitan areas. 839, an all-service overlay, was approved by the South Carolina Public Service Commission in 2019.

Area code 803 is one of the original 86 area codes assigned in 1947, when it was assigned to serve the entire state. In 1995, the Upstate was split off into a separate numbering plan area with area code 864. Until then, South Carolina had been one of the most populated states with just one area code.

While this was intended as a long-term solution, the rapid growth of telecommunication service in Columbia and the coastal region, forced additional mitigation action for 803 within two years. As a result, in 1998 the coastal region was assigned area code 843.

In May 2020, numbering plan area 803 was converted into an overlay plan by adding area code 839 to the plan area. The new area code is used for new subscribers. This implementation made ten-digit dialing mandatory in the numbering plan area as of April 2020. Previously, a permissive ten-digit dialing began in late October 2019.

Service area

Major cities
Aiken pop. 29,494
Columbia pop. 133,803
Rock Hill pop. 74,342
Sumter pop. 40,524

Counties

Richland
Sumter
Kershaw
Fairfield
Lee
Clarendon
Orangeburg
Calhoun
Lexington
Aiken
Lancaster
York
Chester
Newberry
Barnwell
Bamberg
Edgefield

References

External links

List of exchanges from AreaCodeDownload.com, 803 Area Code

803
803
Telecommunications-related introductions in 1947